Estadio Parque Alfredo Víctor Viera is a multi-purpose stadium in Montevideo, Uruguay.  It is the home of Montevideo Wanderers Fútbol Club, and is currently used solely for football matches.  The stadium holds 7,243 people and was built in 1933. It has 4 seating sections, named after great players of the team: Obdulio Varela, Cayetano Saporitti, René "Tito" Borjas and Jorge "Chifle" Barrios.

The stadium is located in the heart of the Prado neighborhood of Montevideo, in the intersection of Buschental Avenue and Atilio Pelossi Road.

References

Sports venues completed in 1933
Viera
V
Montevideo Wanderers
Prado, Montevideo